Hellbound is the debut album by the Danish psychobilly band the Nekromantix, released in 1989 by Tombstone Records. After a few initial performances the band played a large festival in Hamburg, Germany and were offered the recording contract which resulted in this album.

Track listing
All songs written by Gaarde/Sandorff

Personnel
Kim Nekroman - double bass, vocals
Peter Sandorff - guitar, backing vocals
Peek - drums

Album information
Record label: Tombstone Records
All songs written by Gaarde/Sandorff.
Artwork and design by Kim Nekroman

References

Nekromantix albums
1989 debut albums